Satpal Gosain (1935 – 2 December 2020) was an Indian politician, leader of Bharatiya Janata Party from Punjab, India. He was a member of the Punjab Legislative Assembly. Gosain had served as Deputy Speaker of the assembly two times from 2000 to 2002 and from 2007 to 2011 and a cabinet minister in Government of Punjab.

References

1935 births
2020 deaths
Deputy Speakers of the Punjab Legislative Assembly
Bharatiya Janata Party politicians from Punjab
Punjab, India MLAs 2007–2012
Punjab, India MLAs 1997–2002